Reynier Village is a neighborhood on the Westside of Los Angeles, California.

Geography

Reynier Village is a triangular-shaped neighborhood bordered on the north by Cadillac Avenue; on the west by Robertson Boulevard; and on the southeast by Kramerwood Place, the 10 Freeway, and Garth Avenue.

Reynier Village is south of La Cienega Heights and southwest of Faircrest Heights.

The Los Angeles Times' Mapping L.A. project places Reynier Village is in the larger neighborhood of Mid-City. However, according to the Reynier Village neighborhood association, the village is in Zone 5 of the South Robertson neighborhood.

History

According to locals, the subdivision was named after a family whose home stood on what it now the city-maintained Reynier Park.

Rocha House, the 13th Los Angeles Historic-Cultural Monument, is located in the village.

For many years, real estate agents had called the area "Beverlywood adjacent" or "south Robertson" (the name of the neighborhood council, which encompasses several neighborhoods including Reynier Village).

Parks and recreation

 Reynier Park - 2803 Reynier Avenue
Facility Features include: Barbecue Pits, Basketball Courts (Lighted / Outdoor), Children's Play Area and Picnic Tables.

Notes and references

Neighborhoods in Los Angeles
Westside (Los Angeles County)
West Los Angeles